Terre-Neuve can refer to these locations:
 Terre-Neuve, Artibonite, a commune in Haiti
 Terre Neuve, Saint-Louis-du-Sud, a village in the Saint-Louis-du-Sud commune
 Terre-Neuve, Saint Barthélemy, quartier of Saint Barthélemy
 Terre-Neuve, French name for the Canadian island of Newfoundland

See also
 Terra Nova (disambiguation)